Gornomariysky District (Kurykmarij kundem; , Kyryk mary kymdem) is an administrative and municipal district (raion), one of the fourteen in the Mari El Republic, Russia. It is located in the west of the republic and is the only district on the right bank of the Volga River. It borders with Yurinsky District in the north, Kilemarsky District and the Chuvash Republic in the south, and with Nizhny Novgorod Oblast in the west. Its administrative center is the town of Kozmodemyansk (which is not administratively a part of the district). As of the 2010 Census, the total population of the district was 25,869.

Administrative and municipal status
Within the framework of administrative divisions, Gornomariysky District is one of the fourteen in the republic. It is divided into 10 rural okrugs, comprising 241 rural localities. The town of Kozmodemyansk serves as its administrative center, despite being incorporated separately as a town of republic significance—an administrative unit with the status equal to that of the districts.

As a municipal division, the district is incorporated as Gornomariysky Municipal District. Its ten rural okrugs are incorporated as ten rural settlements within the municipal district. The town of republic significance of Kozmodemyansk is incorporated separately from the district as Kozmodemyansk Urban Okrug, but serves as the administrative center of the municipal district as well.

Demographics
The district is a home of Hill Mari people, and the Hill Mari language is spoken there.

See also
Mari Depression

References

Notes

Sources

External links
Official website of Gornomariysky District 
Pictures of Gornomariysky District 

Districts of Mari El